Sawai Singh Dhamora (Sawai Singh Shekhawat; born 1926 and died September 13, 2017) was a Rajasthani poet and writer.  He wrote various Rajasthani books like Peru Prakash, Gandi Gatha, Cittaur̥a ke jauhara va śāke.

References

1926 births
2017 deaths
Rajasthani-language writers
Indian male poets